Zif is a Palestinian village located  south of Hebron. The village is in the Hebron Governorate in the southern West Bank. According to the Palestinian Central Bureau of Statistics, Zif had a population of 848 in 2007.  The primary health care facilities in the village itself are designated by the Ministry of Health as level 1 and at nearby Yatta as level 3.

History

Iron Age 
Zif is identified with the biblical town of Ziph. It appears several times in the Hebrew Bible as a town in the vicinity of Hebron that belongs to Tribe of Judah. The nearby "Wilderness of Ziph" is mentioned as a place where David hides himself from Saul. Later, the town of Ziph is said to be fortified by Rehoboam. Its name was found on a number of royal Judahite LMLK seals along with those of Hebron, Socoh and MMST.

Iron Age remains were found in the nearby tell.

Classical Era 
Zif existed as a village in the Roman era. It had a Jewish population until at least the 4th century, but it became Christian during the Byzantine period.

The remains of a Byzantine-era Christian communal church have been discovered at Zif.  Pot sherds from the Byzantine era have also been found here.

Ottoman Era 
In 1838 Edward Robinson was the first to identify the village Zif and its adjacent Tell Zif with the biblical town of Ziph.

In 1863 Victor Guérin visited and described the ruins.

In 1874 surveyors from the PEF Survey of Palestine visited, and noted about Tell ez Zif: "A large mound, partly natural; on the north side a quarry; on the south are tombs. One of these has a single chamber, with a broad bench running round; on the back wall are three kokim with arched roofs, the arches pointed on the left side wall; at the back is another similar koka. A second tomb was a chamber, 8 feet to the back, 9 feet wide, with three recesses, one on each side, one at the back; they are merely shelves, 8 feet by 5 feet, raised some 2 feet. This tomb has a porch in front, supported by two square rock-cut piers.

Zif Today 
Zif has been under Israeli occupation since 1967.

In September 2002, a bomb filled with screws and nails, planted by Jewish settlers, exploded in the village's school, wounding five children. A second bomb was found by the school's principal and was detonated by Israeli bomb experts.

References

Bibliography

 (p. 315)
 
 

 (p. 408)

External links
Zif Village | قرية زيف      on Facebook   
 Zif Village (Fact Sheet),  Applied Research Institute–Jerusalem, ARIJ
Zif Village Profile, ARIJ
Zif  aerial photo, ARIJ
The priorities and needs for development in Zif village based on the community and local authorities’ assessment, ARIJ
Survey of Western Palestine, Map 21:    IAA, Wikimedia commons

Villages in the West Bank
Hebron Governorate
Ancient Jewish settlements of Judaea
Municipalities of the State of Palestine
Biblical archaeology